The Podolia electoral district was a constituency created for the 1917 Russian Constituent Assembly election.

The electoral district covered the Podolian Governorate. Podolia was close to the frontline. U.S. historian Oliver Henry Radkey, whose work is one of the sources for the results table below, cites that the Ukrainian Social Democratic Labour Party organ Robitchna Gazeta reported that elections were held in Podolia between Dec 3-7, and presented results from 9 out of 12 uezds, but that Robitchna Gazeta's party tally greater than the vote cast in the 9 uezds, possibly pointing to results included from the remaining 3 uezds. The conservative Russkoe Slovo reported normal voting conditions in Podolia.

Results

References

Electoral districts of the Russian Constituent Assembly election, 1917
1910s elections in Ukraine